Pamela Ayres MBE (born 14 March 1947) is a British poet, comedian, songwriter and presenter of radio and television programmes. Her 1975 appearance on the television talent show Opportunity Knocks led to appearances on other TV and radio shows, a one-woman touring stage show and performing before The Queen.

Early life
Pam Ayres was born in Stanford in the Vale, Berkshire (now administered as part of Oxfordshire), the youngest of six children (having four elder brothers and a sister) of Stanley and Phyllis Ayres. Her father worked for 44 years as a linesman for the Southern Electricity Board, having been a Sergeant in the Grenadier Guards during the Second World War. Ayres considered her upbringing "a country childhood"; she was raised in one of a row of small council houses.

After leaving Faringdon Secondary School at the age of 15, she joined the Civil Service as a clerical assistant and worked at the Army (RAOC) Central Ordnance Depot in Bicester. She soon left and signed up for the Women's Royal Air Force, where she trained as a Plotter Air Photographer, working at JARIC in a drawing office dealing with operational maps. Whilst serving in the air force, she gained O-level passes in English language and English literature and began her career as an entertainer. On leaving the WRAF, she went through a number of jobs, before ending up at Smiths Industries, Witney, where she spent six years, working as a 'Confidential Secretary'. While at Smiths, Ayres began performing at a local folk club, and this led eventually to an invitation to read on BBC Radio Oxford in 1974. Her reading of her poem The Battery Hen was re-broadcast as Pick of the Week on the Today programme on BBC Radio 4, leading to a six-month contract with Radio Oxford. Her recital went on to feature as an item in the BBC's Pick of the Year. In February 1976, she left Smiths to pursue poetry full-time. 

In September 2006, the BBC's Magazine Monitors "10 Things...", claimed, though without providing details, to have learnt that week (1-8 Sep) that Bob Dylan inspired Ayres to write poetry. However, although Ayres has often spoken of her admiration of Dylan, in a 2015 interview, she stated that "I don't know that he [Dylan] ever was the inspiration to start writing poetry... I certainly loved him."
In a 2006 interview (aired on Radio New Zealand's Nine To Noon programme, 24 October 2006), she stated that, at the age of twelve, she enjoyed writing parodies of the Lonnie Donegan songs popular at that time.

Career
In 1975, Ayres appeared on the television talent show Opportunity Knocks. This led to a wide variety of guest appearances on TV and radio shows. Since then she has published six books of poems, toured in a one-woman stage show, hosted her own TV show and performed her stage show for the Queen.

Her poetry has a simple style and deals with everyday subject matter. Her poem "Oh, I Wish I'd Looked After Me Teeth", was voted into the Top 10 of a BBC poll to find the nation's 100 Favourite Comic Poems. In the UK Arts Council's report on poetry, Ayres was identified as the fifth best-selling poet in Britain in 1998 and 1999.

From 1996, Ayres has appeared frequently on BBC Radio: from 1996 until 1999 Ayres presented a two-hour music and chat show every Sunday afternoon on BBC Radio 2; this was followed by two series of Pam Ayres' Open Road, in which she visited various parts of the United Kingdom, interviewing people with interesting stories to tell about their lives and local areas. More recently Ayres has become a regular contributor to BBC Radio 4, appearing in programmes such as Just a Minute, Say the Word, That Reminds Me, and six series of her own show, Ayres on the Air, a radio show of her poetry and sketches.

In 2007, Ayres acted in a radio sitcom, Potting On for Radio 4, co-starring Geoffrey Whitehead. She wrote and recorded six series of her Radio 4 programme Ayres on the Air, the latest of which was broadcast in 2018.

Since 2002 Ayres has appeared a number of times on Channel 4 in Countdown's Dictionary Corner alongside Susie Dent.

In 2009, she made her first appearance on the BBC TV programme, QI. In 2011 she said in a Daily Telegraph magazine interview that she was "about to go on my 14th tour of Australia".

Her autobiography, The Necessary Aptitude: A Memoir, was published in 2011. It traces her life and career from growing as the youngest of six children in a council house in the Vale of the White Horse, Berkshire, her time in the Women's Royal Air Force and the string of events that led to Opportunity Knocks. The title refers to the number of times she was told in her life she "did not have the necessary aptitude".

In 2013 she published her latest book of poems, entitled You Made me Late Again!

In September 2021, her TV series The Cotswolds with Pam Ayres premiered on Channel 5. Each episode features a special guest and ends with Pam reciting a short, uplifting verse summing up her adventures. In 2022, the programme was recommissioned as The Cotswolds and Beyond with Pam Ayres, as the programme expanded its remit to have Ayres visit the market town of Pershore to meet Toyah Willcox, as well as going to the Henley Regatta with Steve Redgrave, the Dean Forest Railway and the gardens at Highgrove, where she met King Charles III in an episode filmed at the time when he was still the Prince of Wales.

Influence
The poet John Cooper Clarke has cited Ayres' early success on Opportunity Knocks as being highly influential on his career.

Personal life
Ayres is married to theatre producer Dudley Russell, and they have two sons, William and James. They live in the Cotswolds and keep rare breeds of cattle, as well as sheep, pigs, chickens, and guinea fowl. Ayres is a keen gardener and beekeeper. She is a patron of the British Hen Welfare Trust, Cheltenham Animal Shelter and Oak and Furrows Wildlife Rescue Centre.

Ayres was the guest on BBC Radio 4's Desert Island Discs in 1979 and again in 2018.

In 2004, she was appointed MBE for services to literature and entertainment.

Select bibliography and discography
1976: Some of Me Poems. London: Galaxy Records 
1976: Some More of Me Poems and Songs. London: Galaxy Records 
1978: Thoughts of a Late-Night Knitter. London: Arrow Books 
1978: All of Pam's Poetry; illustrated by Roy Garnham Elmore. London: Hutchinson  (including the contents of her first three books)
1985: Dear Mum: Poems for Mums and their Babies. London: Severn House Publishers 
1992: Pam Ayres: the Works. London: BBC Books, Sep 1992 
1998: With These Hands: a collection. London: Orion, Feb 1998 
2006: Surgically Enhanced. London: Hodder & Stoughton, Sep 2006 
2013: You Made me Late Again!. London: Ebury Press, Sep 2013 
2019: Up in the Attic. London: Ebury Publishing, Oct 2019 
2022: Who Are You Calling Vermin?. London: Ebury Spotlight, Sept 2022 Audio CDs2005: Ayres on the Air. BBC Audio, highlights from BBC Radio 4 series 
2006: Pam Ayres: Ancient and Modern. London: Hodder & Stoughton, Nov 2006 DVDs 2006: Pam Ayres: In Her Own Words (Acorn Media, March 2006); recorded live at The Everyman Theatre, Cheltenham in September 2005
 2011: Pam Ayres, Word Perfect: Live from the Theatre Royal Windsor (Acorn Media, September 2011)Autobiography'''
 2011: The Necessary Aptitude: A Memoir. Ebury Press, September 2011 

References

Further reading
Eunice Salmond "A life in the day of Pam Ayres"; The Sunday Times Magazine''; 24 May 1981

External links

 
The Wonderbra Song - an example of Ayres' poetry
Several more examples of Ayres' poetry (Note: this page has an embedded music file).

1947 births
Living people
20th-century English poets
21st-century English memoirists
20th-century English women writers
21st-century English women writers
British humorous poets
English radio personalities
English women poets
English voice actresses
English television actresses
Members of the Order of the British Empire
People from Vale of White Horse (district)
English beekeepers
BBC Radio 2 presenters
Women's Royal Air Force airwomen
Actresses from Berkshire
British women memoirists
English women non-fiction writers
English spoken word artists
Women humorists
British women radio presenters
English comedy writers
Women beekeepers